HeySong Corporation is a well-known beverage producer in Taiwan. It was founded in 1925 as a family business, and later on grew into a large corporation.

History

The first chairman of the corporation, Chang Wen-chi (張文杞), founded “Jian Hsin Corporation Limited” (進馨商會) in 1925 with six of his cousins, when Taiwan was still under the Japanese rule, by buying a Japanese beverage producer in Taiwan named "Nikoniko" (Japanese: ニコニコ; Chinese: 尼可尼可). The company at first engaged in production of soda under the brands of "Fuji" (富士牌) and ramune under the brands of "Sanshou" (三手牌). The name "Fuji" is a Japanese word and meant the quality their products were as good as the Japanese ones. The name "Sanshou" literally meant "three hands" and signified the co-operation between the three families under the same clan within the company. It used the "HeySong" trademark to produce the "HeySong Soda" in 1931. One of their most well-known product, HeySong Sarsaparilla Drink, a kind of Sarsi, was put into market in 1950. Later on, it started to produce various kinds of beverage including sports drinks, teas, coffees, fruit drinks, and even alcohol. The Headquarters of the company moved from the Taipei plant (now known as the Breeze Center) into the HeySong Commercial Building (黑松通商大樓) on Hsin Yi Road (信義路), Taipei City in 1987.

The name of the company was changed from "Chien Hsin Co. Ltd." to "HeySong Beverages Co., Ltd." in 1970, and later on changed to the present name "HeySong Corporation" in 1981. The original English name of the company and the drinks change from "HeSung" to "HeySong" in 1974.

Products
 HeySong Soda (黑松汽水)
 HeySong Sarsaparilla (黑松沙士)
 FIN Healthy-Support Drink
 Wincafe Coffee (韋恩咖啡)
 Biedermeier Coffee (畢德麥雅)
 Ocean Coffee
 Hey-Song Justea (就是茶)
 CHERICO Juice Drink (吉利果)
 Oasis Juice Drink (綠洲果汁)
 Barley Barony classic whisky (貝里經典威士忌)
 Barley Barony scotch whisky (貝里蘇格蘭威士忌)

Museums
 HeySong Beverage Museum

See also
 List of companies of Taiwan

References

External links

 Official website

Food and drink companies of Taiwan
Taiwanese brands
Food and drink companies established in 1925
1925 establishments in Taiwan